Elina Svitolina was the defending champion and successfully defended her title, defeating Simona Halep in a rematch of the previous year's final, 6–0, 6–4.

Halep and Caroline Wozniacki were in contention for the WTA no. 1 singles ranking at the beginning of the tournament. Halep retained the top ranking when Wozniacki lost in the quarterfinals.

This tournament marked the retirement of former US Open finalist Roberta Vinci. She lost in the first round to Aleksandra Krunić.

Seeds
The top eight seeds received a bye into the second round.

Draw

Finals

Top half

Section 1

Section 2

Bottom half

Section 3

Section 4

Qualifying

Seeds

Qualifiers

Lucky losers

Qualifying draw

First qualifier

Second qualifier

Third qualifier

Fourth qualifier

Fifth qualifier

Sixth qualifier

Seventh qualifier

Eighth qualifier

References

External links
 Main draw
 Qualifying draw

Women's Singles